Fiq or FIQ may refer to:

Places

Ethiopia
 Fiq, Ethiopia
 Fiq (woreda)
 Fiq Zone

Syria
 Fiq District
 Fiq, Syria, a former Syrian town in the Golan Heights

Other uses
 Fast interrupt request
 Fédération de l'informatique du Québec, the Information Technology Federation of Quebec
 Fédération Internationale des Quilleurs, now World Bowling
 Festival Internacional de Quadrinhos
 FIQ Development Center, an Iranian financial services company
 Fiqh, Islamic jurisprudence
 Financial Intelligence Quotient

See also
 Afek (disambiguation)